The Scared Crows is a 1939 Fleischer Studios animated short film starring Betty Boop.

Plot
Betty Boop tries some spring planting, but the crows spoil everything so she makes herself a scarecrow and shoos off the birds but during the process a crow was injured, as it hits a tree. Betty picks the crow up and puts him into a basket. She asks Pudgy to take care of him. But soon Pudgy grew sleepy and went off to sleep. When the crow was left unguarded it became conscious and called the rest of his herd in to a house for a "party" as soon as Pudgy was woken up by one of the crows (who threw an eaten apple). Everything was in a mess. The crows try to make fun of Pudgy and many ways to get him out. In the end, they took a blanket, wrapped it around pudgy and threw him out of the house via the door. Pudgy warns Betty about the crows in the house. The crows then used eggs and berries as ammunition. As she was running away from the crows, Betty trips against the scarecrow that she made earlier and got an idea. She dressed up as the scarecrow herself and scare them off eventually.

References

External links
The Scared Crows on Youtube.
The Scared Crows at the Big Cartoon Database.

1939 short films
Betty Boop cartoons
1930s American animated films
American black-and-white films
1939 animated films
Paramount Pictures short films
Short films directed by Dave Fleischer
Fleischer Studios short films
1930s English-language films
American animated short films
Animated films about dogs
Animated films about birds
American comedy short films